Kenneth "Ken" Robert Handler was an American screenwriter, director and film composer. Born on March 22, 1944, in Los Angeles, California, he is the son of Mattel founders, Elliot Handler and 
Ruth Handler, creators of the Barbie and Ken doll, the latter of which is named after him. He directed Delivery Boys and A Place Without Parents.

Early life
Handler attended Hamilton High School, played piano and enjoyed watching movies with subtitles.

Personal life
Handler married his wife Suzie Handler in 1963. They had three children. Handler died on June 11, 1994 from a brain tumor, though some claims have been made that Handler was a closeted gay man and died from complications related to AIDS.

References 

Ken Handler at IMDb

1944 births
1994 deaths
American directors
American people of Polish-Jewish descent
American screenwriters
Barbie
Mattel people